is a Japanese writer. She has won the Akutagawa Prize, the Noma Literary Prize, and the Yomiuri Prize, among other literary prizes. The Government of Japan has awarded her the Medal with Purple Ribbon and Order of the Rising Sun, and she has been appointed to the Japan Art Academy. Her work has been adapted for film by Akira Kurosawa and Hideo Onchi.

Early life and education 
Murata was born in 1945 in Yahata, Fukuoka. After graduating from junior high school she worked a variety of jobs, including delivering newspapers, welding, working as a waitress in a coffee shop, and taking tickets at a movie theater. She married her husband, an engineer, in 1967, and began writing while raising her children.

Career 
In 1976 Murata received her first award for fiction when her story "Suichū no koe" ("Voice under Water"), about a woman attempting to help protect children after the loss of her own child, won the Kyushu Art Festival Literary Prize. After writing for several years and publishing her own private literary periodical, Murata was nominated for the Akutagawa Prize in the first half of 1986 for her story "Netsuai" ("Ardent Love"), a story about two boys engaged in a dangerous motorcycle race. The prize committee expressed concern about its initial publication in a minor journal, and she did not win. Murata was again nominated for the Akutagawa Prize in the second half of 1986 for her story "Meiyū" ("Allied Friends"), but again did not win.

Murata won the Akutagawa Prize on her third nomination. In the first half of 1987 her novella "Nabe no naka" ("In the Pot"), about a grandmother who entertains her visiting grandchildren with stories about their relatives, won the 97th Akutagawa Prize. Bungeishunjū then published "Nabe no naka" as the title story of Murata's first short story collection, which also included "Suichū no koe", "Netsuai", and "Meiyū". Akira Kurosawa wrote a screenplay based on "Nabe no naka", which he later filmed and released under the title Rhapsody in August. An English translation of "Nabe no naka", translated by Kyoko Iriye Selden, was published in a 2015 collection of fiction by Japanese women writers.

After winning the Akutagawa Prize, Murata continued publishing novellas and full-length novels, including her 1990 work , which won the 29th Women's Literature Prize; the 1994 novel , which was later adapted into the 2003 Hideo Onchi film Warabi no kō; the story , which won the 29th Kawabata Yasunari Literature Prize; and the 1998 novel , which won a 49th MEXT Arts Award in the literature category.

In 2007 the Government of Japan recognized Murata's cultural contributions by awarding her a Medal with Purple Ribbon. Three years later her short story collection , a set of stories told as the nightly dreams of a woman who has returned to her hometown to sell her family home, was published by Shinchosha. Kokyō no wagaya won the 63rd Noma Literary Prize.

Murata's 2013 novel , a story about a teenage girl who is sold into prostitution by her parents and then helps organize a prostitute labor strike, won the 65th Yomiuri Prize in the fiction category. After winning the Yomiuri Prize, Murata again received national honors for her artistic contributions to Japanese culture, receiving the Order of the Rising Sun, Gold Rays with Rosette, in 2016, followed by a lifetime appointment as one of the 120 stipendiary members of the Japan Art Academy in 2017.

Personal life 
Around the time of the 2011 Tōhoku earthquake and tsunami, Murata was diagnosed with uterine cancer and sought radiation treatment, an experience she later used as the basis of her novel .

Recognition 
 1976: 7th Kyushu Art Festival Literary Prize
 1987: 97th Akutagawa Prize (1987上)
 1990: 29th Women's Literature Prize
 1998: 25th Kawabata Yasunari Literature Prize
 1999: 49th MEXT Arts Award
 2007: Medal with Purple Ribbon
 2010: 63rd Noma Literary Prize
 2014: 65th Yomiuri Prize (FY2013)
 2016: Order of the Rising Sun
 2017: Japan Art Academy
 2019: Tanizaki Prize

Film and other adaptations 

 Rhapsody in August, 1991
 Warabi no kō, 2003

Bibliography

Selected works in Japanese 
 , Bungeishunjū, 1987, 
 , Bungeishunjū, 1990, 
 , Bungeishunjū, 1994, 
 , Bungeishunjū, 1998, 
 , Bungeishunjū, 1998, 
 , Shinchosha, 2010, 
 , Shinchosha, 2013, 
 , Asahi Shimbun, 2016,

Works in English 
 "Nabe no naka", trans. Kyoko Iriye Seldon, Japanese Women Writers: Twentieth Century Short Fiction, 2015

References

1945 births
Living people
20th-century Japanese novelists
20th-century Japanese women writers
21st-century Japanese novelists
21st-century Japanese women writers
Japanese women novelists
Writers from Fukuoka Prefecture
Akutagawa Prize winners
Yomiuri Prize winners